José Pereda, also known as "El Chino" for his Japanese origin (born 8 September 1973 in Lima) is a retired Peruvian footballer.

Club career
Pereda played for a number of clubs in Peru, including Universitario and Cienciano. He also had a spell with Boca Juniors in the Primera División de Argentina.

International career
Pereda made 27 appearances for the senior Peru national football team from 1996 to 2001.

References

External links

1973 births
Living people
Footballers from Lima
Peruvian people of Japanese descent
Association football midfielders
Peruvian footballers
Peru international footballers
Peruvian Primera División players
Argentine Primera División players
Club Universitario de Deportes footballers
Cienciano footballers
Boca Juniors footballers
FBC Melgar footballers
Coronel Bolognesi footballers
Peruvian expatriate footballers
Peruvian expatriate sportspeople in Argentina
Expatriate footballers in Argentina
1999 Copa América players
León de Huánuco managers